Kyle "Pezman" Peschel is a video game producer, director and editor. He lives in Santa Monica, California.

Peschel is credited in the game TimeShift (2007) as Sierra's external producer. He was the senior producer of Battle Engine Aquila (2003).

Peschel is the owner of gaming news site GameGossip and the GameGossip Community Forums. He used to be the Head Administrator at Ataricommunity Forums.

Games credited

Brütal Legend (2008), Vivendi Games
TimeShift (2007), Vivendi Games
Marc Ecko's Getting Up: Contents Under Pressure (2006), Atari
Retro Atari Classics (2005), Atari
Dead Man's Hand (2004), Atari
Forgotten Realms: Demon Stone (2004), Atari
Shadow Ops: Red Mercury (2004), Atari
Unreal Tournament 2004 (2004), Atari
Unreal Tournament 2004 (DVD Special Edition) (2004), Atari
Apex (2003), Infogrames
Battle Engine Aquila (2003), Infogrames
Enter the Matrix (2003), Infogrames
Mission: Impossible Operation Surma (2003), Atari
Neverwinter Nights Gold (2003), Atari
Neverwinter Nights: Hordes of the Underdark (2003), Atari
Superman: Countdown to Apokolips (2003), Infogrames
Terminator 3: Rise of the Machines (2003), Atari
Terminator 3: War of the Machines (2003), Atari
Unreal II: The Awakening (2003), Infogrames
Big Air Freestyle (2002), Infogrames
Godzilla: Destroy All Monsters Melee (2002), Infogrames
Godzilla: Domination (2002), Infogrames
Gothic II (2002), JoWooD Productions
Men in Black II: Alien Escape (2002), Infogrames
Neverwinter Nights (2002), Infogrames
Splashdown (2002), Infogrames
Superman: Shadow of Apokolips (2002), Infogrames
Tactical Ops: Assault on Terror (2002), Infogrames
TransWorld SURF (2002), Infogrames
Unreal Championship (2002), Infogrames
Unreal Tournament 2003 (2002), Infogrames
Aliens Versus Predator 2 (2001), Sierra On-Line
MX Rider (2001), Infogrames
World's Scariest Police Chases (2001), Activision, Fox Interactive
The Operative: No One Lives Forever (2000), Fox Interactive

References

MobyGames: Kyle Peschel

External links
TimeShift Clocked! (Interview with Kyle Peschel)
TimeShift Developer Interview (video)
GameGossip

American video game designers
Living people
Video game directors
Year of birth missing (living people)